Carolyn Finney (born 1959), is a storyteller, author, artist, educator, and  currently a scholar-in-residence in the Franklin Environmental Center at Middlebury College.  Finney's work reveals how nature and the environment are racialized in America. She began her professional journey as an actor; for eleven years she worked in television (commercials, Beauty and the Beast) while honing her craft. After leaving acting, Finney spent five years backpacking through Africa, Asia and Europe, and living in Nepal. Inspired by this experience, Finney furthered her education and completed her Bachelors of Arts at Fairhaven College at Western Washington University in gender and international development. She completed her Masters of Social Science at Utah State University focusing on international rural community development. She went on to fulfill her Ph.D. in Geography at Clark University. Finney's full-time work is engaging with a wide variety of organizations, institutions and community groups in her capacity as a public speaker, consultant, advisor and writer.

Social media 
Finney has done interviews with diverse media platforms including, The Tavis Smiley Show, MSNBC, NPR, Vice News Tonight and podcasts such as the Meat Eater Hunting Collective podcast, Unladylike podcast, and the Bike Nerds podcast where she shared her insights on race and environment in the U.S. Finney's podcasts can be found on Spotify, Apple Podcast, Google Play, IHeartRadio and YouTube. As social media use increased and many events became virtual during the pandemic, Finney transitioned to Zoom (software) as well as Cisco web and Google Meets to continue her livestreams and answer audience questions in real time.

Publications 
In 2014, Finney published her first book, "Black Faces, White Spaces: Reimagining the Relationship of African Americans to the Great Outdoors," a book that centers on the experience of African Americans and the environment around within the context of the U.S. history and the mainstream environmental movement. She argues that African Americans have frequently overcome barriers to the outdoors and, despite these obstacles, have indeed frequently appeared in nature. She explores why this reality has been ignored in both popular imagination and historical record. Finney analyzes the disconnect between America’s understanding of nature during the environmental movement of the mid-20th century and the collective experiences of nature of Black people, and writes that their relationship with the outdoors has been historically dictated for them.

With the events of 2020, the demand for her book increased significantly, resulting in a greater demand for Finney as a public speaker, consultant and creative. Finney has written an extensive number of articles for diverse outlets including, Newsweek, The Guardian and Outside magazine and is currently the new columnist for The Earth Island Journal. Finney is working on a new book of creative nonfiction that takes a more personal journey into understanding the very complicated relationship between race, land and belonging in the U.S.

Current projects 
At present, Finney is working on her one-woman show,The N Word: Nature, Revisited, is an imagined conversation with John Muir which will be workshopping the show at the New York Botanical Gardens Humanities Institute in the summer of 2021 as part of her Mellon residency. In addition, Finney is working with Emmy-award winning documentary film-maker Irene Taylor (Vermilion Films) who is including her family’s story in an upcoming HBO documentary about humans complex relationship to trees.

Education 
In her early college years, Finney focused on liberal arts degree and eventually dropped out to pursue a career in acting. After 11 years of acting, Finney embarked to travel the world, inspiring her to return to college. There, she completed her Bachelors of Arts in gender and international development in Western Washington University and her Master of Social Science in international rural community development at Utah State University. After graduating, she continued her education at Clark University in Massachusetts and earned her Ph.D. focusing on Geography.

Recognition 

Finney has been a Fulbright Scholar (2001), a Canon National Parks Science Scholar (2003), and received a Mellon Postdoctoral Fellowship in Environmental Studies at Wellesley College.

Selected publications 
Finney, C. 2020. The Perils of Being Black in Public: We are all Christian Cooper and George Floyd. The Guardian.

Finney, C. 2020. Self-Evident: Reflections on the Invisibility of Black Bodies in Environmental Histories. BESIDE Magazine, Montreal.

Finney, C. 2019 . “This Moment”. River Rail: Occupy Colby.

Finney, C. 2019. “A Thousand Oceans” . Geographical Research, Wiley Pub.

Finney, C. 2018. “The Space Between the Words” . Harvard Design Journal.

Finney, C. 2014.  Black Faces, White Spaces: Reimagining the Relationship of African Americans to the Great Outdoors. University of North Carolina Press.

Finney, C.  2014.  Doing it Old School: Reflections on Giving Back.  Journal of Research Practice Athabasca University Press, Canada

Finney, C.  2013. Ode to New York: A Performance Piece.  Center for Humans and Nature.

Finney, C.  2013. Brave New World? Ruminations on Race in the 21st Century. Antipode (early view online Wiley-Blackwell).

Finney, C.  2012.  Child’s Play: Finding the Green in the In Between.  In Companions in Wonder: Reflections on Children and Adults Exploring Nature, Julie Dunlap and Steven Kellert, editors, MIT Press.

References 

Living people
1959 births
Middlebury College faculty
African-American women writers
African Americans and education
Environmental studies scholars
American public speakers
Clark University alumni
Western Washington University alumni
Utah State University alumni
American storytellers
21st-century African-American people
20th-century African-American people
20th-century African-American women
21st-century African-American women
African-American writers